Daneshgah-e Esfahan (Isfahan University) Metro Station is a station on Isfahan Metro Line 1. The station opened on 18 March 2018. It is located on Hezar Jarib in between Mardavij St. and Azadi Ave. The next station on the north side is Azadi Station. The station is located next to University of Isfahan campus, which is its namesake.

References

Isfahan Metro stations
Railway stations opened in 2017